Ellas, inocentes o culpables, is a Mexican telenovela produced by TV Azteca in 2000.

Lupita D'Alessio and Luis Uribe star as the main protagonists, Iliana Fox, Leonardo García and Jorge Luis Pila as co-protagonists, while  star as the main antagonists.

Cast 
 Lupita D'Alessio as Amanda
 Luis Uribe as Ángel
 Roberto Montiel as Roberto
  as Sergio
 Iliana Fox as Vicky
 Leonardo García as Mario
 Jorge Luis Pila as Luis
 María Rojo as Martha
 Susana Alexander as María
 Enrique Novi as Damián
 Júlio Aldama as Hilario
 Fidel Garriga as Rogelio
 Gerardo Acuña as Nicolás
 Loló Navarro as Eulalia
 Vanessa Villela as Cristina
 Griselda Contreras as Mariana
 Ana Graham as Georgina
 Alejandro Gaytán as Jorge
 Géraldine Bazán as Liliana
 Ramiro Orci as Benito
 Beatriz Martínez as Marga
 Wendy de los Cobos as Cecilia
 Martha Acuña as Larissa
 Magdalena Cabrera as Rosa
 Graciela Orozco as Carmen
 Mauricio Ferrari as Marcelo
 Enrique Becker as Matías
 Julián Antuñano as Diego
 Gianni Constantini as Saúl
 Sandro Finoglio as Poncho
 Blas García as Comandante Cienfuegos
 Enrique Marine as Ricardo
 Mónica Mendoza as Janddy
 Eduardo Schillinsky as Armando
 Rutilio Torres as Pepe
 Rocío Verdejo as Regina

References

External links 

2000 telenovelas
2000 Mexican television series debuts
2000 Mexican television series endings
TV Azteca telenovelas
Mexican telenovelas
Spanish-language telenovelas